Torremaggiore is a town, comune (municipality) and former seat of a bishopric, in the province of Foggia in the Apulia (in Italian: Puglia), region of southeast Italy.
 
It lies on a hill,  over the sea, and is famous for production of wine and olives.

History 
The history of Torremaggiore is strictly connected to that of the burg of (Castel) Fiorentino (di Puglia), a Byzantine frontier stronghold founded by the Italian catepan Basil Boioannes in 1018.
 Later a Norman, Hohenstaufen, Angevine and finally Aragonese possession, it is especially remembered as the death place of Holy Roman Emperor Frederick II on 13 December 1250.
 Five years later the burg was attacked by Pope Alexander IV's troops, and the inhabitants fled to a nearby Benedictine abbey. Later they were allowed to found a new settlement, called Codacchio, later, when other refugees from Dragonara arrived, christened Terra Maioris ("Major Land"), the modern Torremaggiore. This burg was later a fief of the Counts (later Dukes) of Sangro. It was destroyed by an earthquake on July 30, 1627.
 On 17 March 1862 a platoon of newly united Italy's royal troops was defeated by the brigands of Carmine Crocco; 21 soldiers were killed, even their captain Francesco Richard.
 From 25 August 1925, Torremaggiore was connected to the nearby San Severo by a tramway, the first in southern Italy.

Ecclesiastical history 
Fiorentina was the seat of the Roman Catholic Diocese of Fiorentino, established in 1059. In 1391 it was suppressed and its territory merged into the Diocese of Lucera. The name Fiorentino (Florentinensis)  has been used, since 1969 as a Latin Catholic titular bishopric.

Main sights 
 Castle of Fiorentino (11th century), place of death of  Emperor Frederick II.
 Castle of Dragonara (11th century).
 The Castle of the Dukes (originally Counts) of Sangro, built from a Norman tower, has maintained the Renaissance appearance. It includes four circular and two square towers, and a throne hall with a 17th-century fresco frieze. It is home to the archaeological exhibition of findings from Fiorentino.
 Chiesa matrice di San Nicola ("Mother Church of St. Nicholas", 13th century), built by the refugees from Fiorentino and Dragonara, rebuilt in 1631 after the earthquake.
 Church of Santa Maria della Strada (early 16th century).
 Sanctuary of Santa Maria della Fontana.
 Church of the Madonna di Loreto (16th century), erected by Albanian immigrants. It was rebuilt in 1627.
 Church of Santa Maria degli Angeli (17th century).

People 
 Rogerius of Apulia (c.1205–1266), medieval Roman Catholic monk and chronicler
 Luigi Rossi (1597–1653), musician
 Raimondo di Sangro (1710–1771), prince and scientist
 Nicola Fiani (1757–1799), patriot and radical, executed after the collapse of the Parthenopean Republic
 Fortune Gallo (1878–1970), opera impresario
 Nicola Sacco (1891–1927), anarchist, executed with Bartolomeo Vanzetti following a controversial American trial
 Giuseppe Eccellente  (1880-1931), violinist, Terremaggiore

Twinned cities 
  Buffalo, United States
  Canosa di Puglia,  Italy
  Villafalletto, Italy

See also 
 Foggia Airfield Complex, also known as Torremaggiore Airfield
 List of Catholic dioceses in Italy

References

Sources and external links 
 GCatholic with residential and titular incumbent biography links

Cities and towns in Apulia
Castles in Italy
1018 establishments in Europe
11th-century establishments in Italy
Populated places established in the 11th century